Srečko Katanec (born 16 July 1963) is a Slovenian professional football manager and former player who is the head coach of the Uzbekistan national team. At international level, he was capped for both the Yugoslavia and Slovenia national teams.

A former midfielder, who was also capable of playing as a defender, Katanec is regarded as one of the greatest Slovenian footballers of all time, having represented Yugoslavia at the 1984 and 1988 Summer Olympics, UEFA Euro 1984 and the 1990 FIFA World Cup. After Slovenian independence, Katanec made five appearances for the newly formed Slovenia national team before retiring from professional football.

During his club career, Katanec won a Yugoslav League championship with FK Partizan and was a runner-up of the 1988–89 UEFA Cup with VfB Stuttgart. In his five-year spell with Sampdoria, he won the Serie A championship, the Coppa Italia and the European Cup Winners' Cup, as well as finishing as a runner-up in the 1992 European Cup Final, losing to Barcelona.

Under his management, Slovenia qualified for its first-ever UEFA European Championship and the FIFA World Cup in 2000 and 2002, respectively.

Playing career

Katanec began playing football at the age of seven with NK Ljubljana. In 1981, he joined Olimpija; in 1985, he joined Dinamo Zagreb; while the next year, he signed with Partizan and was a Yugoslav champion in 1987.

In 1988, Katanec joined VfB Stuttgart in the German Bundesliga. The club reached the 1989 UEFA Cup Final, but lost to Diego Maradona's Napoli. Katanec played just one season for Stuttgart. In 1989, he signed for Italian Serie A side Sampdoria, where he won the European Cup Winners' Cup in his first season. In 1991, Sampdoria won the Scudetto as Serie A champions, while the next year, the club reached the 1992 European Cup Final, losing to Barcelona. In 1994, he also won the Coppa Italia with Sampdoria under manager Sven-Göran Eriksson.

Katanec was a member of the Yugoslavia national team for the 1984 European Championship in France, but he has fonder memories of 1984 Olympics in Los Angeles, where Yugoslavia team won a bronze medal. He was playing successfully in the qualifying round for 1990 FIFA World Cup in Italy so he became the third Slovenian to play at a World Cup, where he appeared in three of Yugoslavia's five matches. These would be his last three caps for Yugoslavia. Altogether, he appeared in 31 matches and scored 5 goals.

Katanec played five more matches (and scored a goal) for the independent Slovenia national team, but appeared in only one official match. That was a qualifying round for the 1996 European Championship in England, on 7 September 1994 in Maribor against Italy. Soon after, his contract with Sampdoria expired and he finished his football playing career.

Managerial career
Between 1996 and 1997, Katanec was an assistant manager of Drago Kostanjšek at the Slovenia under-21 team. In December 1997, he became a head coach of Gorica, signing a two-and-a-half-year contract. In July 1998, he was announced as the Slovenian national team manager.

With Slovenia, he qualified for the 2000 UEFA European Championship after eliminating Ukraine in the qualifying play-offs, which was the country's first-ever appearance at the major tournament. At the tournament, Slovenia earned draws against FR Yugoslavia and Norway, and lost to Spain. Slovenia also managed to qualify for the 2002 FIFA World Cup, where they lost all three matches against Spain, South Africa and Paraguay. After the first game, Katanec had a huge argument with the team's star player Zlatko Zahovič, who was sent home. He resigned immediately after the World Cup. On 2 November 2002, he became the new manager of Olympiacos. Under Katanec's command, Olympiacos played worse than expected, and on 7 February 2003 the club terminated his contract with immediate effect due to poor performances and a bad atmosphere in the team.

In 2004, Katanec was a candidate to become the national team manager of Croatia; however, Zlatko Kranjčar was chosen instead of him.

On 17 February 2006, Katanec was appointed as Macedonia's head coach for the UEFA Euro 2008 qualifiers. Following a mixed set of results in the qualifying campaign for the 2010 FIFA World Cup, including a 1–0 win against Scotland and a 4–0 loss to the Netherlands, Katanec resigned from the position on 6 April 2009. On 23 June 2009, he was presented as a new head coach of the United Arab Emirates national team. He was sacked on 6 September 2011 after two successive defeats in the third round of qualifiers for the 2014 FIFA World Cup.

On 31 December 2012, he accepted the offer from the Football Association of Slovenia to become the manager of Slovenia for the second time, and was officially appointed on 4 January 2013. He resigned in October 2017 after failing to qualify for the 2018 FIFA World Cup.

On 4 September 2018, Katanec was appointed as head coach of the Iraq on a three-year contract. His first major competition was the 2019 AFC Asian Cup, where he managed to achieve what he had failed with Slovenia and the United Arab Emirates, by reaching the knockout stages in a major tournament for the first time, as his Iraq reached the round of 16 before losing to the eventual champions Qatar 1–0. Under his management, Iraq also achieved a notable 2–1 win over neighbour Iran in the 2022 World Cup qualifiers, as well as guiding Iraq to the third round of AFC qualifiers, but due to conflict with the federation over six months of unpaid salaries, Katanec departed as coach in July 2021.

On 27 August 2021, Katanec was appointed as head coach of Uzbekistan on a four-year contract.

Personal life
Katanec was born in Ljubljana to Croat parents from Međimurje. He has two sons, Svit Oliver and Ian Oskar.

Career statistics

Club

Managerial

Honours

Player
Partizan
 Yugoslav First League: 1986–87

VfB Stuttgart
 UEFA Cup runner-up: 1988–89

Sampdoria
 Serie A: 1990–91
 Coppa Italia: 1993–94
 Supercoppa Italiana: 1991
 Cup Winners' Cup: 1989–90
 European Cup runner-up: 1991–92

References

External links

Srečko Katanec at the Football Association of Slovenia website 

1963 births
Living people
Footballers from Ljubljana
Yugoslav footballers
Slovenian footballers
Slovenian people of Croatian descent
Association football central defenders
Association football midfielders
NK Ljubljana players
NK Olimpija Ljubljana (1945–2005) players
GNK Dinamo Zagreb players
FK Partizan players
VfB Stuttgart players
U.C. Sampdoria players
Yugoslav First League players
Bundesliga players
Serie A players
Yugoslav expatriate footballers
Slovenian expatriate footballers
Yugoslav expatriate sportspeople in West Germany
Yugoslav expatriate sportspeople in Italy
Expatriate footballers in West Germany
Slovenian expatriate sportspeople in Italy
Expatriate footballers in Italy
Slovenian football managers
ND Gorica managers
Slovenia national football team managers
Slovenian expatriate football managers
Slovenian expatriate sportspeople in Greece
Expatriate football managers in Greece
Olympiacos F.C. managers
Super League Greece managers
Slovenian expatriate sportspeople in North Macedonia
Expatriate football managers in North Macedonia
North Macedonia national football team managers
Slovenian expatriate sportspeople in the United Arab Emirates
Expatriate football managers in the United Arab Emirates
United Arab Emirates national football team managers
Slovenian expatriate sportspeople in Iraq
Expatriate football managers in Iraq
Iraq national football team managers
Slovenian expatriate sportspeople in Uzbekistan
Expatriate football managers in Uzbekistan
Uzbekistan national football team managers
Yugoslavia international footballers
Slovenia international footballers
Dual internationalists (football)
Olympic footballers of Yugoslavia
Olympic medalists in football
Olympic bronze medalists for Yugoslavia
Medalists at the 1984 Summer Olympics
Footballers at the 1984 Summer Olympics
Footballers at the 1988 Summer Olympics
UEFA Euro 1984 players
1990 FIFA World Cup players
UEFA Euro 2000 managers
2002 FIFA World Cup managers
2011 AFC Asian Cup managers
2019 AFC Asian Cup managers